Kulab (also Romanized as Kūlāb; also known as Gūlāb, Koolav, and Kūlād) is a village in Poshtkuh-e Mugui Rural District, in the Central District of Fereydunshahr County, Isfahan Province, Iran. At the 2006 census, its population was 61, in 11 families.

References 

Populated places in Fereydunshahr County